Zakir Asker oghlu Hasanov (born 6 June 1959) is an Azerbaijani politician and colonel general who has been the Minister of Defence of Azerbaijan since 2013.

Early life and education
He was born on 6 June 1959 in the Astara District. He graduated from the Baku High Army Commanders School in 1980 as an artillery officer before serving for five years in the Soviet Armed Forces Units in East Germany. Afterwards, he spent the next eight years at the Altay military registration and enlistment office of the Siberian Military District as part of the Ministry of Defence of the USSR.

Political career

Following the fall of the Soviet Union, he served for a decade in the Border Troops of the Ministry of National Security of Azerbaijan. He was then promoted to the chief of office of international relations of the State Border Service before being appointed Deputy Minister of Interior and Commander of the Internal Troops by a presidential decree on 17 January 2003, when he was also promoted to the rank of major-general four months later.

He was previously the Deputy Minister of Internal Affairs.

Defence Minister

Karabakh Conflict 
Upon coming into office as the Minister of Defence, he made statements in regard to the Nagorno-Karabakh conflict. This included saying that the Azerbaijani army was strong and disciplined as opposed to that of Armenia and that "the situation in the Armenian armed forces is disastrous. In case of war the troops of this country will escape from the field of battle." He also told the European Union that his country would support liberating its lands peacefully but he emphasized that Azerbaijan reserves the right to liberate "its occupied lands". This came at the same time as E.U. Special Representative for the South Caucasus Philippe Lefort congratulated him on his appointment.

During the 2016 April War, Hasanov stated that if shelling of Azerbaijani settlements by Armenian forces did not cease, Azerbaijan would consider launching an artillery bombardment on Stepanakert. In April 2019, Hasanov warned that "If Armenians go on the offensive, it will give me the opportunity to meet with him Armenian Defence Minister David Tonoyan in Yerevan", implying an armed incursion.

Representative functions 
In October 2017, a garrison military parade of the Nakhchivan Garrison was held through the capital of the Nakhchivan Autonomous Republic in honor of the 25th anniversary of the establishment of the first military unit of the National Army, being attended by Defense Minister Hasanov on behalf of the national government. He commanded the Day of the Armed Forces and Liberation Day parades on Azadliq Square in June and September 2018, with the latter commemorating the centennial of the Battle of Baku. Hasanov represented Azerbaijan at the 2019 Pakistan Day Parade in Islamabad. On 2 July 2019, on the instruction of President Aliyev, a delegation led by Hasanov visited Kima Davidovich (the mother of Belarusian-Azerbaijani soldier Anatoly Nikolayevich Davidovich) while she was being treated in a clinical hospital in Minsk, on the eve of his attendance at the celebrations in honor of the 75th anniversary of the Minsk Offensive. Due to the COVID-19 pandemic, he represented President Aliyev at the 2020 Moscow Victory Day Parade on Red Square.

Personal life 
He is married with three children. He is fluent in German, English, Russian and Turkish.

Awards

Orders and medals 
 Medal for Distinguished Service in Defending the State Borders – 1998
 Medal for Distinguished Military Service –  2002
 Azerbaijani Flag Order – 2004
 Medal for Distinguished Service for Fatherland – 2008
 Azerbaijani Flag – 2016
 Shohrat Order – 2019
 Zafar Order – 2020

Ranks 

 Major General (2003)
 Lieutenant General (2005)
 Colonel General (2013)

References

1959 births
Living people
Azerbaijani generals
Azerbaijani politicians
Government ministers of Azerbaijan
Ministers of Defense of Azerbaijan
People from Astara District
Azerbaijani military personnel of the 2020 Nagorno-Karabakh war